Marian Dziędziel (born 5 August 1947) is a Polish actor. He received three Polish Academy Award for Best Actor nominations and won once for his role in The Wedding (2004). In his career spanning half a century, Dziędziel has appeared in more than one hundred films and television series.

Selected filmography

References

External links

1947 births
Living people
Polish male film actors
Polish male television actors
Polish male stage actors
People from Wodzisław County
Recipients of the Order of Polonia Restituta